Simon Christopher Bryant (born 22 November 1982) is a former professional association footballer, who spent five years (1999–2004) in The Football League with Bristol Rovers.

Bryant began his career as a trainee with Bristol Rovers and after being promoted to the professional ranks at the club in 1999,remained at the club as a player until 2004. During this spell he went on loan to Tiverton Town during the Christmas and new year period in 2003/2004.

He signed for Mangotsfield United in the summer of 2008, but left the club after less than a month, citing work commitments, without having played a single competitive match, whereupon he joined Cadbury Heath in August that year. He moved to Oldland Abbotonians a year later, where he made 12 league appearances, scoring once, during the 2009–10 season.

In October 2011 he was appointed as assistant coach to Martyn Grimshaw at Longwell Green Sports F.C.

In December 2021 Simon played in his first game in 10 years for Seymour United, realising his dream playing alongside his life-long friend David Plummer.

References

External links
Player profile on the Cadbury Heath website

1982 births
Living people
Footballers from Bristol
English footballers
Association football midfielders
English Football League players
National League (English football) players
Bristol Rovers F.C. players
Tiverton Town F.C. players
Forest Green Rovers F.C. players
Mangotsfield United F.C. players
Cadbury Heath F.C. players
Oldland Abbotonians F.C. players
Longwell Green Sports F.C. players